Bass Lake is a lake in Faribault County, in the U.S. state of Minnesota.

Bass Lake is well-stocked with bass fish, hence the name.

See also
List of lakes in Minnesota

References

Lakes of Minnesota
Lakes of Faribault County, Minnesota